"Red Umbrella" is a song recorded by American country music singer Faith Hill. It was released in September 2007 as the second single from her compilation album The Hits. Hill debuted the song on The Ellen DeGeneres Show in early September. It was her twenty-ninth single release to country radio, and in late 2007, the song reached a peak of number 28 on the Billboard country charts. It was written by Brad Warren, Brett Warren, Aimee Mayo and Chris Lindsey.

Content
"Red Umbrella" is an up-tempo song consisting of abstract imagery, in which the narrator explains that she will be all right despite the troubles in her life. She compares love to a "red umbrella" to cover her from the rain.

Critical reception
Billboard gave Red Umbrella a positive review, saying "It's a positive love song that is uplifting and sweet, but doesn't venture too far into saccharine territory. And just when you'd think the world's songwriters might have run out of new ways to describe love, here's a fresh analogy: 'Your love is like a red umbrella/Walk the streets like Cinderella/Everyone can see it on my face.' Hill's performance is perfection."

Jim Malec of The 9513 gave the song a "thumbs down", saying "The song's verses blow by at breakneck pace, which is a good thing, considering the fact that 'Red Umbrella' has some of the most random and generally incogitative lyrics I've ever heard", although he did commend Hill's vocal performance and considered the chorus "catchy".

Chart performance

References

Songs written by Aimee Mayo
Songs written by the Warren Brothers
Songs written by Chris Lindsey
2007 songs
Faith Hill songs
2007 singles
Song recordings produced by Byron Gallimore
Warner Records singles